Al Talaba Stadium, is a multi-use stadium in Baghdad, Iraq.  It is used mostly for football matches and serves as the home stadium of Al-Talaba SC. The stadium holds 10,000 people.  

Football venues in Iraq
Sport in Baghdad